Secrets & Mysteries is a television series which originally aired in syndication from 1988 to 1989.  It was hosted by Irish actor Edward Mulhare and dealt with topics of a paranormal nature, as well as mysterious historical events.  It was similar to the 1970s/1980s series In Search of....

"Secrets of the Unknown invites you into the world of the bizarre, strange, and unusual. From ninjas who are said to transform into panthers, to the peculiar myths and rituals surrounding King Tut's tomb, to Hitler's occult connections, the sinking of the Titanic, the disappearance of Amelia Earhart, Bigfoot, UFOs, ghosts, dreams and nightmares, the Hindenburg disaster, and other subjects. These documentaries provide a rich visual showcase for unexplained phenomena."

The series is considered a pioneer in the realm of historical and paranormal investigative television, and is also considered to be something of a cult classic among many fans. The series consists of 26 episodes, written by Erik Nelson and produced by Craig Haffner.  It was released on home video in the late 1980s to the early 2000s under the title Secrets of the Unknown.

Opening Sequence
After a brief introduction of what the episode had in store, the opening sequence would feature a series of provocative images to set the tone of the show. A series of 3D images reveal a mansion on top of Devil's Tower. Other images featured the Hindenburg disaster followed by the sinking of the Titanic and a pyramid featuring the all-seeing eye, tarot cards and Stonehenge. The title sequence would form over the mansion with a figure in the window. The figure would turn and reveal himself to be host Edward Mulhare. "It's time for our journey to begin." He would look into an old-fashioned zoetrope machine, which would feature preview images of the episode topic. Mulhare would then throw a switch, powering the mechanisms on the set and begin his opening narration.

Releases
There have been several VHS releases over the years. The series has yet to be released on DVD or Blu-ray. All titles listed below remain out of print.

Episodes
Episodes are listed alphabetically by title rather than production or air date order. Production codes and premiere dates remain unknown.

References

External links

1980s American reality television series
1988 American television series debuts
1989 American television series endings
First-run syndicated television programs in the United States
Paranormal reality television series